Muzala Samukonga (born 9 December 2002) is a Zambian track and field sprinter who specializes in the 400 metres. He won a gold medal at the 2022 African Championships at the age of 19. He also won a gold medal at the 2022 Birmingham Commonwealth Games, finishing in 44.66 seconds in the 400 metre race.

Career
Samukonga competed in the 400 m event at the 2021 World Athletics U20 Championships in Kenya, where he finished in fifth place after clocking 45.89 s. He recorded a new personal best of 45.65 s in Botswana in March 2022.

On 10 June 2022, Samukonga won a gold medal in the 400 m event at the 2022 African Championships in Mauritius, upsetting Bayapo Ndori in the finals with a time of 45.31 s. His victory ended a ten-year reign in the 400 m by athletes from Botswana, namely Isaac Makwala and Baboloki Thebe. It also qualified him for the 2022 World Athletics Championships the following month in Eugene, Oregon.

Achievements

Personal bests
All information taken from World Athletics profile.

International championships results

References

External links
 

Living people
2002 births
Zambian male sprinters
African Championships in Athletics winners
Commonwealth Games gold medallists for Zambia
Commonwealth Games medallists in athletics
Athletes (track and field) at the 2022 Commonwealth Games
Medallists at the 2022 Commonwealth Games